Adam R. Dell (born January 14, 1970) is an American venture capitalist and is the brother of Michael Dell, the founder of computer manufacturing company Dell Inc.

Early life and education
Dell was born in Houston, Texas to a German Jewish family. He attended Tulane University and the University of Texas School of Law.

Career
He began his career working as a corporate attorney for Winstead Sechrest & Minick, in Austin, Texas, before joining the venture capital firm of Enterprise Partners in La Jolla, California. He then joined Crosspoint Venture Partners, in Woodside, California, where he became a partner in 1999. In 2000 he formed Impact Venture Partners, a $100mm early stage venture capital firm, in New York City. Dell joined Austin Ventures as a venture partner in 2009. Dell joined Goldman Sachs as a partner in 2018.

During the course of his career, Dell invested in numerous technology companies such as Hotjobs.com, which was acquired by Yahoo! in 2002; Ingenio, which was acquired by AT&T in 2007; and OpenTable.

He founded four companies, Clarity Money, which was acquired by Goldman Sachs in 2018; Civitas Learning; Buzzsaw.com, which was acquired by AutoDesk in 2002; and MessageOne, which was acquired by Dell, Inc. in 2008.

Dell has served as an adjunct professor at both the Business School at Columbia University and the University of Texas School of Law.

Personal life 
In 2010, Dell had a daughter with Padma Lakshmi.

References

Living people
1970 births
American venture capitalists
Tulane University alumni
Businesspeople from Houston
Businesspeople from New York City
University of Texas School of Law alumni
American people of German-Jewish descent
Jewish American attorneys
Lawyers from Houston
21st-century American Jews